Pasindu Lakshanka (born 21 July 1996) is a Sri Lankan cricketer. He made his first-class debut for Sri Lanka Air Force Sports Club in the 2014–15 Premier Trophy on 16 January 2015.

References

External links
 

1996 births
Living people
Sri Lankan cricketers
Colts Cricket Club cricketers
Sri Lanka Air Force Sports Club cricketers
Sportspeople from Galle